David Geoffrey Clatworthy (11 July 1960 – 8 September 2020) was a South African actor and director.

Personal life
Clatworthy was born on 11 July 1960 in South Africa. He completed education from Pretoria Boys High School. From 1978 to 1979, he became the regimental instructor for the School of Artillery. In 1980, he enrolled to the University of Cape Town to study a bilingual Performer's Diploma in Speech and Drama. He graduated with the degree in 1983.

He was married to fellow actress Wilmien Rossouw. The couple had two children. He was later in a relationship with Michelle Botha, where they have a son.

He diagnosed with an esophagus cancer for some time. He died on 8 September 2020 at the age of 60.

Career
He made notable performances in many theatre plays such as; The King and I, Life Is a Pitch, Macbeth, Revamp, The Boys Next Door, and Beyond Therapy. He played the role "Jamie" in Long Day’s Journey Into Night, where he won the Fleur Du Cap Award for Best Supporting Actor. Apart from that, he was also nominated for a Fleur Du Cap Award and the Dalro award in 1989. In 1990, he made film debut with Return to Justice and played the role "Hayes".

In 2008, he acted in the SABC2 television sitcom On the Couch with the role "Arno". In 2012, he starred as "Commander Schoeman" in the Mzansi Magic crime drama serial Mshika-shika. In 2013, he made a guest role in the SABC3 sitcom Safe. In 2016, he joined with the kykNET Afrikaans soap opera Getroud met Rugby and played the role "Gerald Richter". In the meantime, he also became a director of the show. In 2018, he played the role "Clive Wright" in SABC2 sitcom Konsternasie Oppie Stasie. Other than that, he acted in the international science fiction film District 9 and joined with the first season of Netflix film The Crown.

Apart from cinema, theatre and television, he rendered his voice in over 100 radio dramas. Some his other notable film appearances came through, Mia et le lion blanc, Harry Game, Young Ones, The Making of the Mahatma, Everyman's Taxi, Lunar Cop, Verraaiers, Platteland, and Winnie Mandela.

Filmography

References

External links
 IMDb

1960 births
2020 deaths
South African male film actors
South African male television actors
South African male stage actors
White South African people
Deaths from esophageal cancer
Deaths from cancer in South Africa